Punarjanman in Hinduism is a Sanskrit word that refers to "repeated birth", "transmigration", "re-birth" or "a  principle  of  
diachronic ontogeny". According to Y. Krishan, the ultimate goal of the Indian religions, such as Hinduism, Buddhism, Jainism, Sikhism, and that of the Upanishads, has been based on attainment of moksha, nirvana, and consequently the termination of punarjanman or 'rebirth'.

References

Citations 
 
 

Hindu philosophical concepts
Moksha